Linow may refer to:

People
 Ivan Linow (1888 – 1940), also known as Jack Linow, Latvian-born American wrestler and character actor

Places
 Linów, a village in the administrative district of Gmina Zawichost, within Sandomierz County, Świętokrzyskie Voivodeship
 Linów, a village in the administrative district of Gmina Zwoleń, within Zwoleń County, Masovian Voivodeship
 Linów-Kolonia, a village in the administrative district of Gmina Zawichost, within Sandomierz County, Świętokrzyskie Voivodeship
 Linów-Leśniczówka, a settlement in the administrative district of Gmina Zwoleń, within Zwoleń County, Masovian Voivodeship
 Lake Linow, a volcanic lake located outside Tomohon, near Manado, Indonesia